Kelly Gadéa (born 16 December 1991) is a French footballer who plays for French Division 1 Féminine club Le Havre. She is equally adept at playing as either a central defender or a defensive midfielder. Gadéa had two stints with Montpellier having started her career with the club in 2005. In 2007, she joined Saint-Étienne and established herself as an up-and-coming talent domestically and internationally. After three seasons with the club, Gadea returned to Montpellier in 2010.

Gadéa is known for her leadership ability and has, subsequently, captained several of her age groups in international competitions. She has represented France at under-17, under-19, and under-20 levels. With the under-20 team, she played in the 2010 FIFA U-20 Women's World Cup. Her most notable moment in the competition came in a group stage match against Germany. With France trailing 4–1 in the second half, following a free-kick, Gadéa received the ball and took a chipped, driven shot straight at the goal. The ball went into the back of the net before bouncing back out, however, no goal was given by the referee. France lost the match by the same scoreline and was eliminated from the competition by goal difference. The non-call was similar to what happened the previous month at the 2010 FIFA World Cup in a match against England and Germany, which led to calls for the introduction of goal-line technology.

References

External links

 
 Kelly Gadea at Montpellier HSC 
 
 
 
 FFF profile 
 Player French football stats at footofeminin.fr 

1991 births
Living people
French women's footballers
France women's youth international footballers
France women's international footballers
Footballers from Nîmes
Montpellier HSC (women) players
AS Saint-Étienne (women) players
Olympique de Marseille (women) players
Division 1 Féminine players
Women's association football central defenders
FC Fleury 91 (women) players